Jorge Díaz Serrano (6 February 1921 – 25 April 2011) was a Mexican politician and engineer, member of the Institutional Revolutionary Party, ambassador to the Soviet Union, senator, and director general of Pemex from 1976 to 1981.

References

Instituto Politécnico Nacional alumni
Ambassadors of Mexico to the Soviet Union
1921 births
2011 deaths
Politicians from Sonora
People from Nogales, Sonora
20th-century Mexican politicians
Institutional Revolutionary Party politicians
National Autonomous University of Mexico alumni
Members of the Senate of the Republic (Mexico)